The 1997 Youngstown State Penguins football team was an American football team represented Youngstown State University in the Gateway Football Conference during the 1997 NCAA Division I-AA football season. In their 12th season under head coach Jim Tressel, the team compiled a 13–2 record (4–2 against conference opponents) and defeated McNeese State in the 1997 NCAA Division I-AA Football Championship Game. It was Youngstown State's fourth national championship in seven years.

Quarterback Demond Tidwell received the team's most valuable player award. The team's statistical leaders included Tidwell with 1,961 passing yards, Jack Andreadis with 1,057 rushing yards and 1,688 all-purpose yards, and Adrian Brown with 122 points.

Schedule

References

Youngstown State
Youngstown State Penguins football seasons
NCAA Division I Football Champions
Youngstown State Penguins football